In mathematics, a volume form or top-dimensional form is a differential form of degree equal to the differentiable manifold dimension. Thus on a manifold  of dimension , a volume form is an -form. A manifold admits a nowhere-vanishing volume form if and only if it is orientable. An orientable manifold has infinitely many volume forms, since multiplying a volume form by a function yields another volume form. On non-orientable manifolds, one may instead define the weaker notion of a density.

A volume form provides a means to define the integral of a function on a differentiable manifold.  In other words, a volume form gives rise to a measure with respect to which functions can be integrated by the appropriate Lebesgue integral.  The absolute value of a volume form is a volume element, which is also known variously as a twisted volume form or pseudo-volume form.  It also defines a measure, but exists on any differentiable manifold, orientable or not.

Kähler manifolds, being complex manifolds, are naturally oriented, and so possess a volume form.  More generally, the th exterior power of the symplectic form on a symplectic manifold is a volume form. Many classes of manifolds have canonical volume forms: they have extra structure which allows the choice of a preferred volume form.  Oriented pseudo-Riemannian manifolds have an associated canonical volume form.

Orientation 

The following will only be about orientability of differentiable manifolds (it's a more general notion defined on any topological manifold).

A manifold is orientable if it has a coordinate atlas all of whose transition functions have positive Jacobian determinants. A selection of a maximal such atlas is an orientation on  A volume form  on  gives rise to an orientation in a natural way as the atlas of coordinate charts on  that send  to a positive multiple of the Euclidean volume form 

A volume form also allows for the specification of a preferred class of frames on  Call a basis of tangent vectors  right-handed if

The collection of all right-handed frames is acted upon by the group  of general linear mappings in  dimensions with positive determinant.

Thus a volume form gives rise to an -structure as well. Conversely, given an -structure, one can recover a volume form by imposing for the special linear frames and then solving for the required -form  by requiring homogeneity in its arguments.

A manifold is orientable if and only if it has a nowhere-vanishing volume form. Indeed,  is a deformation retract since  where the positive reals are embedded as scalar matrices. Thus every -structure is reducible to an -structure, and -structures coincide with orientations on  More concretely, triviality of the determinant bundle  is equivalent to orientability, and a line bundle is trivial if and only if it has a nowhere-vanishing section. Thus, the existence of a volume form is equivalent to orientability.

Relation to measures 

Given a volume form  on an oriented manifold, the density  is a volume pseudo-form on the nonoriented manifold obtained by forgetting the orientation. Densities may also be defined more generally on non-orientable manifolds.

Any volume pseudo-form  (and therefore also any volume form) defines a measure on the Borel sets by

The difference is that while a measure can be integrated over a (Borel) subset, a volume form can only be integrated over an oriented cell. In single variable calculus, writing  considers  as a volume form, not simply a measure, and  indicates "integrate over the cell  with the opposite orientation, sometimes denoted ".

Further, general measures need not be continuous or smooth: they need not be defined by a volume form, or more formally, their Radon–Nikodym derivative with respect to a given volume form need not be absolutely continuous.

Divergence

Given a volume form  on  one can define the divergence of a vector field  as the unique scalar-valued function, denoted by  satisfying

which is a generalization of the divergence theorem.

The solenoidal vector fields are those with   It follows from the definition of the Lie derivative that the volume form is preserved under the flow of a solenoidal vector field.  Thus solenoidal vector fields are precisely those that have volume-preserving flows.  This fact is well-known, for instance, in fluid mechanics where the divergence of a velocity field measures the compressibility of a fluid, which in turn represents the extent to which volume is preserved along flows of the fluid.

Special cases

Lie groups 

For any Lie group, a natural volume form may be defined by translation.  That is, if  is an element of  then a left-invariant form may be defined by  where  is left-translation.  As a corollary, every Lie group is orientable.  This volume form is unique up to a scalar, and the corresponding measure is known as the Haar measure.

Symplectic manifolds 

Any symplectic manifold (or indeed any almost symplectic manifold) has a natural volume form.  If  is a -dimensional manifold with symplectic form  then  is nowhere zero as a consequence of the nondegeneracy of the symplectic form.  As a corollary, any symplectic manifold is orientable (indeed, oriented).  If the manifold is both symplectic and Riemannian, then the two volume forms agree if the manifold is Kähler.

Riemannian volume form 

Any oriented pseudo-Riemannian (including Riemannian) manifold has a natural volume form.  In local coordinates, it can be expressed as

Here,  is the absolute value of the determinant of the matrix representation of the metric tensor on the manifold.

The volume form is denoted variously by

Although the Greek letter  is frequently used to denote the volume form, this notation is not universal; the symbol  often carries many other meanings in differential geometry (such as a symplectic form).

Invariants of a volume form

Volume forms are not unique; they form a torsor over non-vanishing functions on the manifold, as follows.

In coordinates, they are both simply a non-zero function times Lebesgue measure, and their ratio is the ratio of the functions, which is independent of choice of coordinates.

No local structure

A volume form on a manifold has no local structure in the sense that it is not possible on small open sets to distinguish between the given volume form and the volume form on Euclidean space .

In one dimension, one can prove it thus:
given a volume form  on  define

Global structure: volume

A volume form on a connected manifold  has a single global invariant, namely the (overall) volume, denoted  which is invariant under volume-form preserving maps; this may be infinite, such as for Lebesgue measure on  On a disconnected manifold, the volume of each connected component is the invariant.

In symbols, if  is a homeomorphism of manifolds that pulls back  to  then

and the manifolds have the same volume.

Volume forms can also be pulled back under covering maps, in which case they multiply volume by the cardinality of the fiber (formally, by integration along the fiber). In the case of an infinite sheeted cover (such as ), a volume form on a finite volume manifold pulls back to a volume form on an infinite volume manifold.

See also

 
 
 Poincaré metric provides a review of the volume form on the complex plane

References

 .
 .

Determinants
Differential forms
Differential geometry
Integration on manifolds
Riemannian geometry
Riemannian manifolds